Taraporewala Aquarium or Taraporevala Aquarium is India's oldest aquarium and one of Mumbai's main attractions. It hosts marine and freshwater fish. The aquarium is located on Marine Drive. The aquarium has a 12-foot long and 180 degree acrylic glass tunnel. The fish are kept in large glass tanks, which will be lit with LED lights.

The aquarium hosts 2,000 fish across over 400 species. Fish from overseas were introduced at the new aquarium. The number of new varieties of 70 marine fish included Helicopter, Arowana, Grouper, yellow-striped tang, bluespotted stingray, sea stars, clownfish, hark, triggerfish, Moorish idol, Azure Damsel, Blueline Demoiselle, Purple Firefish, Cloudy Damsel, Copperband Butterflyfish, Schooling Bannerfish, Raccoon Butterflyfish, White Tail Trigger, Clown Triggerfish and Blue Ribbon Eel.  The 40 new varieties of freshwater fish include Red Devil, Jaguar, Electric Blue, Jack Dempsey, Frontosa and Catfish. These fishes will be housed in larger tanks than before with imported flexi glass for better visibility. The aquarium continues to support sharks, turtles, rays, moray eels, sea turtles, small starfish and stingrays.

The aquarium is maintained by the Department of Fisheries. The aquarium's 16 seawater tanks and 9 freshwater tanks host 31 types of fish, while 32 tropical tanks contains 54 kinds of fish. The tropical section of the aquarium features ecosystems such as the "moss aquarium" for pregnant fish, "plantation aquarium" that features imported varieties of water lilies and other aquatic plants and "island aquarium".

Atin Srivastava 
It was inaugurated by India's first president Rajendra Prasad. The aquarium is named after a Parsee Philanthropist D B Taraporewala, who donated  (at the time equivalent to US$41,754 ) for the construction.

The aquarium reopened after renovation on 3 March 2015. It was renovated at a cost of Rs.22 crore (approx Rs 7.5 crore for aquariums and Rs. 16.5 crore for construction work done by Public Works department).New exhibits:
 Oceanarium in the foyer with  water.
 Amphitheater with 50 seats, screening documentaries on fish, marine ecosystems and environment conservation.
 Touch pool, where curious visitors can touch star fish, sea urchins, sea cucumbers, and turtles.
 Fish spa. You can dip your feet in one of ten tanks of Doctor fish (Garra rufa). The fish nibble and remove dead skin from your feet and legs.
 Coral and rocky ecosystems with aqua scaping and LED lighting.
 Semi-circular tank housing jelly fish.

Species of fishes
 Damselfish: territorial fish species including golden damselfish, moon tail, cocoa, striped, electric blue, talbot, and sergeant major damsel
 Butterflyfish: chevron, copper band, long-nose, eight band, red perl
 Angelfish : blue ring, regal, wraft and emperor angel fishes
 Triggerfish: undulated, bluetooth, picasso and clown triggers
 Marine eels: yellow head, white ribbon, black ribbon, blue ribbon and moray eel
 Marine touch pool with sea cucumber, sea urchin, brittle star, tube worms, star fish and more
 Groupers: sweetlip, panther, orange spot and black spot groupers
 Tangs: yellow, powder brown, naso, orange shoulder, and powder blue
 Unique species: oranda, stone, red cap, rukin, and black moor
 Other species including bat fish, squirrel fish, golden travery, puffers, jelly fishes, kombada, lion and turkey fish, dwarf lion, whimple, moorish idol, marine coral reef, wrasse, sea anemone, negro, clarkii, and arowana
 Paludarium aquarium with Indian carps: rohu, catla, mrigal
 Tropical aquarium fishes, red tail, sucker, upside down and Asiatic cat fishes
 Other species include: octopuses, seahorses, alligators, catfishes, giant gourami, cichlids, koi, gold fish, sea turtles, red-eared slider and Singaporean turtle

References

External links

 Newly Renovated Taraporewala Aquarium - Fish Museum Mumbai
 Lone Turtle from Mumbai’s Taraporewala Aquarium Released

Aquaria in India
Buildings and structures in Mumbai
Tourist attractions in Mumbai
1951 establishments in Bombay State
Zoos in Maharashtra
Zoos established in 1951